The first season of the American television series Black Lightning, which is based on the DC Comics character Jefferson Pierce / Black Lightning, premiered on The CW on January 16, 2018 and ran for 13 episodes until April 17, 2018. The season was produced by Berlanti Productions, Akil Productions, Warner Bros. Television, and DC Entertainment. It was ordered in May 2017 and production began that September, with Salim Akil serving as showrunner.

The season introduces Jefferson Pierce, a high school principal who retired from his superhero identity Black Lightning nine years prior after seeing the effects it had on his family, as he is forced to become a hero again when the rise of the local gang called The 100 leads to increased crime and corruption in his community of Freeland. Cress Williams stars as Jefferson, along with principal cast members China Anne McClain, Nafessa Williams, Christine Adams, Marvin "Krondon" Jones III, Damon Gupton, and James Remar.

Episodes

Cast and characters

Main  
 Cress Williams as Jefferson Pierce / Black Lightning
 China Anne McClain as Jennifer Pierce
 Nafessa Williams as Anissa Pierce / Thunder
 Christine Adams as Lynn Stewart
 Marvin "Krondon" Jones III as Tobias Whale
 Damon Gupton as Billy Henderson
 James Remar as Peter Gambi

Recurring 

 Dabier as Will
 Skye P. Marshall as Kara Fowdy
 Will Catlett as Latavius "Lala" Johnson / Tattoo Man
 Charlbi Dean as Syonide
 Eric Mendenhall as Joey Toledo
 Kyanna Simone Simpson as Kiesha
 Caleb Thomas as Malik
 Amanda Davis as Joan Lincoln
 Jordan Calloway as Khalil Payne / Painkiller
 Tracey Bonner as Lawanda White
 Anthony Reynolds as Deputy Chief Zeke Cayman
 Jill Scott as Evelyn Stillwater-Ferguson / Lady Eve
 Edwina Findley as Tori Whale
 Gregg Henry as Martin Proctor

Guest 

 Roland S. Martin as himself
 Senator Nina Turner as herself
 Fallyn Brown as young Jennifer Pierce
 Clifton Powell as Reverend Jeremiah Holt
 Shein Mompremier as Chenoa
 Chantal Thuy as Grace Choi
 Jason Louder as Frank "Two-Bits" Tanner
 Yolanda T. Ross as Nichelle Payne
 Antonio Fargas as David Poe
 Keith Arthur Bolden as Alvin Pierce
 Kaden Washington Lewis as young Jefferson Pierce

Production

Development 
In September 2016, after going through several incarnations and various stages of development for over a year, Mara Brock Akil, her husband Salim Akil, and perennial Warner Bros. Television producer Greg Berlanti began pitching Black Lightning to television networks. The Akils wrote the script while serving as executive producers alongside Berlanti and his frequent collaborator Sarah Schechter. A week later, the project landed at Fox with a pilot production commitment. In February 2017, Fox opted to not go forward with the pilot, deciding that it was "not a good fit into its already crowded genre drama space" and the project was subsequently shopped to other networks. As the home to several of Berlanti's other television ventures, The CW emerged as the network that was likely to realize the series. The following day, The CW officially ordered a pilot for Black Lightning. The original pilot script that had been written for Fox was discarded and instead, a short presentation was shot ahead of the network's final decisions regarding pickup orders. The CW officially ordered Black Lightning to series on May 10, 2017 with Salim Akil to serve as showrunner. On April 2, 2018, a month after production on the first season had concluded, The CW renewed the series for a second season.

Writing 
In writing the first season, Salim Akil stated that he was most inspired by the original run of Black Lightning comic books and that Black Lightning being a black father who defies the "deadbeat stereotype" was part of the reason for the Akil's wanting to tell his story. "That image of a father saving his daughters, protecting his family, protecting his school, protecting his community, it is happening, but it's not the narrative [on most shows and movies]," said Mara Brock Akil. Salim Akil added, "Jefferson Pierce is the epitome of what black men are: He loves his wife, his children, and the community." He described Jefferson and his family as "the Obamas of the superhero world" and commented that "[t]heir powers, like their race, is only part of who they are." In order for the series to have an "authentic black voice" to support its setting and characters, Black Lightning utilizes a predominantly African-American writing staff. Salim Akil shared that the writers are not all African-American but "have either lived this life or know someone who has." The cast additionally serve to maximize the series' authenticity because, according to the showrunner, "They know what the language feels like in their own community."

Showrunner Akil compared the duality of Jefferson Pierce and his alter ego Black Lightning to the duality of Martin Luther King Jr. and Malcolm X. He said that Jefferson takes after King, where he "would prefer to educate and to love and to be peaceful, but [he understands] that there's a different side." The Black Lightning side of him, in turn, favors the philosophies of Malcolm X, and believes that, "There are some things that I have to do and react to in a way that I'm not going to turn the other cheek." As a character-driven family drama, Salim Akil revealed that Black Lightning would not follow the villain of the week format typical of many superhero television series because he wanted "to explore the characters, even the villains" and felt that "one of the most interesting characters right now from a storytelling standpoint is Tobias [Whale]. His hatred for himself and for others comes from a real place, so we want to know why he's like that." Discussing the character Anissa Pierce, Black Lightning's daughter and the first black lesbian superhero on television, the Akils indicated that the writers would not be treating LGBTQ representation as a "special issue" but that such characters would be included and depicted "the way anyone would be included in life."

Salim Akil noted that topics such as the Black Lives Matter movement and other issues concerning race relations and police brutality would be addressed, but stressed that, "This is an American story, this is not a black story. We're going to be culturally specific, but universal in our themes so everyone can see themselves in these stories." He further explained, "I didn't want to be too fantastical because so many people out there are suffering and I felt like they needed a hero," on the decision to incorporate real-life societal issues into the narrative. Akil emphasized his desire for the audience "to be concerned about what's going on [in African-American communities.] I wanted people in those areas to feel like there was someone who was thinking about them and so I wanted the show to reflect that." Salim Akil likened the narrative of the first season to the story of the Tuskegee experiment. "What I wanted to do was have an arc about black male paranoia and African-American paranoia. So we start in the black community, fighting the gangs. And then this drug is introduced, and everyone's questioning where the drug comes from, and we start to follow the trail of where it comes from [...] and see oh, this stuff isn't coming from the low-level gang members."

Casting 
On February 24, 2017, Cress Williams was announced in the lead role of Jefferson Pierce / Black Lightning. On March 2, China Anne McClain and Nafessa Williams were cast as Jefferson's daughters, Jennifer Pierce and Anissa Pierce, respectively. Later that same month on March 10, it was reported that Christine Adams has been cast as Lynn Stewart, Jefferson's ex-wife. At the 2017 San Diego Comic-Con International on July 22, it was revealed that James Remar and Damon Gupton had joined the main cast as Jefferson's oldest friend Peter Gambi and unlikely ally Inspector William "Bill" Henderson, respectively. On August 10, rapper Marvin "Krondon" Jones III was added as a series regular, landing the role of main antagonist Tobias Whale.

On September 26, 2017, it was announced that Kyanna Simone Simpson would recur as Kiesha, Henderson's daughter and Jennifer's best friend. On October 5, it was reported that Jill Scott had booked a recurring role as the villainous Lady Eve. Later that month on October 12, Edwina Findley also joined the cast in a recurring capacity as Tori Whale, Tobias' younger sister. Chantal Thuy was added to the recurring cast as Grace Choi that same month on October 30, though she ultimately appeared in only two episodes of the series' first season. On December 14, Shein Mompremier was reportedly cast as Chenoa. On January 16, 2018, it was revealed that Skye P. Marshall had been cast in a recurring role as Ms. Fowdy, the vice principal of Garfield High School.

Design 
Black Lightning's costume was designed by Laura Jean Shannon. While the suit's design is meant to invoke protection from the character's vulnerabilities such as his age, and bullets in particular, Salim Akil stated that there were "a lot of iterations" of the Black Lightning costume, and that "at one point I had covered his face and his eyes, but what was more important to me was the emotion, and you need to see that. You need to see his eyes when his daughters have a gun pointed at them." A number of journalists noted similarities between the first superhero costume donned by Anissa Pierce, featuring a pink, purple, and blue color scheme with gold and black accents and a blonde wig, and the Thunder costume of the 2003 Outsiders comic book run. Shannon also designed the final Thunder costume, which was made from a sculpted armor material in order to stretch to the performer's comfort and serves as an homage to the most recent costume worn by Thunder in the comic books.

Filming 
Filming for the short presentation that was given to The CW took place in March 2017 in Atlanta, Georgia. Instead of a full traditional pilot, only about three to nine minutes of footage was used for the eight-to-twelve minute presentation, which was later cut into the series' first trailer. Production for the season officially began on September 7, 2017 in Atlanta. Filming for the first season concluded on March 3, 2018.

Music 
As the music supervisor for Black Lightning, Kier Lehman selected the season's featured songs along with the Akils. Kurt Farquhar composed the score for the season, which he created by "combining elements of trap hip-hop, orchestral scoring, and a liberal use of live voice." The rapper Godholly, who is the son of showrunner Salim Akil, provided original music for the season, including tracks such as "Black Lightning" from the main title sequence. Following the series premiere, the tracks "Black Lightning" and "Power" from Godholly were made available on iTunes, Amazon, and other digital music sites. Additional songs created for the season by Godholly include "Welcome to Freeland" from the second episode, "Green Light" from the fourth episode, "Can't Go" from the eighth episode, and "Thunder" from the ninth episode.

Release

Broadcast 
Black Lightning began airing on The CW in the United States as a mid-season entry on January 16, 2018 during the 2017–18 television season. The first season, consisting of 13 episodes, aired on Tuesdays at 9:00pm following The Flash and concluded its run on April 17, 2018.

Home media 
Having acquired the international distribution and streaming rights for Black Lightning, Netflix aired new episodes of the season weekly in regions outside of the United States, including Canada, Australia, New Zealand, and the United Kingdom. The season was released in its entirety on Netflix in the United States on April 25, 2018, one week after the season finale aired on The CW.

The complete first season of Black Lightning was released on Blu-ray and DVD in Region 1 on June 26, 2018, in Region 2 on January 28, 2019, and in Region 4 in 2018. The set also features extra content including the series' 2017 San Diego Comic-Con panel, new featurettes, deleted scenes, and a gag reel.

Marketing 
On March 29, 2017, The CW released the first promotional image of Cress Williams as Jefferson Pierce in his official Black Lightning superhero costume. On May 18, the first trailer for the series was released. The main cast of the season that were confirmed at the time, as well as executive producers Salim Akil and Mara Brock Akil attended the 2017 San Diego Comic-Con on July 22 to promote the season. On December 12, The CW released key art for the series in the form of the season's first promotional poster featuring Williams, China Anne McClain, and Nafessa Williams as their characters. On January 4, 2018, The CW and Warner Bros Television released the first look at Nafessa Williams as Anissa Pierce in her official Thunder superhero costume. On March 25, the producers and writers of the season attended the 2018 WonderCon and screened the episode "Sins of the Father: The Book of Redemption" at their panel ahead of its official debut on The CW.

Reception

Ratings

Critical response 

The first season of Black Lightning debuted to critical acclaim. On the review aggregation website Rotten Tomatoes, the season is "certified fresh" and holds a 96% approval rating, with an average rating of 8.37/10, based on 51 reviews. The website's critic consensus reads: "Black Lightning doesn't reinvent superhero TV, but it does give the genre a necessary jolt with real-world plots, scary new villains, and a star-making performance from Cress Williams." Metacritic, which uses a weighted average, assigned the season a score of 79 out of 100, indicating "generally favorable reviews" from 25 critics.

Kyle Fowle of The A.V. Club praised the series premiere for its "nuanced storytelling" and gave the episode a "B+" grade. He wrote, "Black Lightning is immediately established as something unique. It's not just the obvious stuff, like the nearly all-black cast or the fact that the series premiere isn't part of a drawn-out origin story. Rather, the difference is in the storytelling. Where Arrow and The Flash felt immediately part of a large, complicated universe, Black Lightning is much more intimate." Reviewing for Entertainment Weekly, Dana Schwartz gave the premiere episode an "A−" grade, adding, "The Pierce family dynamic is so compelling that even if Jefferson Pierce had no powers beyond great motivational speeches, this show would be a worthwhile watch. Black Lightning balances humor with all-too-necessary social commentary [...] to make a refreshing addition to the superhero TV pantheon." Reviewing the first two episodes of the season, The Hollywood Reporters Daniel Fienberg commended the series for its "solid action scenes, bass-pumping soundtrack, stylish treatment of Black Lightning's sizzling powers and character pragmatism." He echoed praise for the series' ability to "stand alone in welcome ways" and described the premiere episode as "smart and relevant and full of an attitude that's all its own." Fienberg also lauded the complexity of the characters and the performances of the cast, particularly that of series star Cress Williams.

Fienberg felt that the second episode slipped in quality compared to the first, in part due to some "painfully tin-eared" dialogue and an underdeveloped setting, but that, "in the Akils, Black Lightning has creators with a specific vision; that in Williams it has a leading man capable of carrying a variety of story approaches; and that as long as it can resist the need to tie in with The CW's other superhero properties, it has a lot of potential as a unique stand-alone." Reviewing the first four episodes of the series, The Atlantics Pilot Viruet wrote, "There's an authenticity to the series—it's neither too pulpy nor too preachy—that's heightened by the strong performances from its predominantly black cast, particularly from Williams, who anchors the show's many conflicts." Concluding, he added that, "like all superhero shows, [the series] can sometimes feel too crowded or uneven. But Black Lightnings greatest success so far is how it has surveyed the different ways black people tackle problems in their own backyards." Nafessa Williams' portrayal of Anissa Pierce, Black Lightning's eldest daughter who becomes the superhero Thunder, also drew attention and praise from critics. As the first black lesbian superhero on television, critics applauded the character's social activism and action scenes, as well as for being a "complex" and "fully realized" character outside of her superhero identity.

Again reviewing for The A.V. Club, Fowle gave the finale an "A" grade, writing that the episode was "tonally bold, easily moving between being funny and politically poignant," while also setting up "plenty of intrigue" for next season. He felt that the "imperfect moments" did not detract from the "overall assuredness" of the episode, which he described as, "about as good a first season finale as you'll find." Fowle concluded that the episode was a "confident, compelling, moving end to a season that boasted all those same qualities throughout." Allison Keene of Collider opined that the "outstanding" first season "effectively wove together the crime fighting and day jobs and the personal lives of the Pierce family, making sure that family always came first." However, she felt that a number of storylines were rushed toward the end of the season, such as Khalil's dark turn and the fates of villains other than Tobias Whale. Jesse Schedeen of IGN noted that the series' reduced episode count, focus on older superheroes and social issues, limited cast, and preservation of the main villain at the end of the season positively distinguished the series from other superhero programming. Reviewing for Revenge of the Fans, Adam Basciano gave the season finale an "A+" grade and, regarding the season as a whole, he wrote, "Black Lightning had a great first season. Consistent, compelling, character driven and action packed. [...] How Black Lightning can top itself next season, I don't know, but I'm anxious to see if it is up to the challenge."

Awards and nominations

References

External links 

2018 American television seasons
Black Lightning (TV series) seasons